John Glenn High School is a public high school in Westland, Michigan. It serves portions of Westland, Canton Township, Inkster, and Dearborn Heights. It is a part of the Wayne-Westland Community Schools district.

History

One of two traditional high schools serving the Wayne-Westland Community Schools, John Glenn High School is located in the city of Westland, Michigan. The school, which opened in 1964, was named for astronaut John Glenn, who just two years prior had become the first American to orbit the earth. The "space" theme dominates at JGHS, including the nickname (Rockets), yearbook (the Satellite), newspaper (the Explorer, formerly the Echo), and school store (the Gantry).

When John Glenn High School opened its doors in 1964, it did not have its own football field, having to play home games on the field of rival Wayne Memorial High School for the better part of its first decade. The building was only a fraction of its current size. To keep up with expanding enrollment in the 1970s and 1980s, new wings were added for Fine Arts and Special Education, as well as a new gymnasium and its own football and baseball fields. Fitting for a school named for an astronaut, JGHS is one of the few high schools in the state to feature a planetarium.

When John Glenn High School opened under principal Frank Higgins, it served students in grades 7-11, expanding to grades 8-12 from 1965-67. After a brief stint as a four-year high school (9-12), it stabilized as a 10-12th grade school in 1970, finally returning to its 9-12 status in 1995 when the Wayne-Westland district adopted a middle school format.

Demographics
The demographic breakdown of the 1,634 students enrolled in 2021-2022 was:

Native American/Alaskan - 0.5%
Asian/Pacific islanders - 2.1%
African American - 37.6%
Hispanic/Latino - 7%
White - 49.2%
Multiracial - 3.4%

49% of students were economically disadvantaged during the 2021-2022 school year

Athletics
The John Glenn Rockets are members of the Kensington Lakes Activities Association.  The school colors are red, white and blue.  The following MHSAA sanctioned sports are offered:

Baseball (boys)
Basketball (boys and girls)
Bowling (boys and girls)
Competitive cheer (girls)
Cross country (boys and girls)
Football (boys)
Golf (boys and girls)
Soccer (boys and girls)
Softball (girls)
Swim and dive (boys and girls)
Tennis (boys and girls)
Track and field (boys and girls)
Volleyball (girls)
Wrestling (boys)

Prior to his tenure at the Michigan Wolverines football team, head coach Lloyd Carr coached the Rockets.

Notable alumni 
Keshawn Martin, New England Patriots wide receiver 
Tony Boles, University of Michigan running back
Josh Gracin, country music singer
Jeremy Langford, Chicago Bears running back
Jewell Jones, state representative
Danielle Hartsell and Steve Hartsell, pairs figure skating US national champions 1999
Guy Rucker, NBA player for the Golden State Warriors
Christina Fuoco, music journalist
Mike Kelley, artist

References

External links

 

Public high schools in Michigan
Schools in Wayne County, Michigan
Educational institutions established in 1964
1964 establishments in Michigan
Westland, Michigan